
This is a  timeline of Roman history, comprising important legal and territorial changes and political events in the Roman Kingdom and Republic and the Roman and Byzantine Empires.  To read about the background of these events, see Ancient Rome and History of the Byzantine Empire.

Following tradition, this timeline marks the deposition of Romulus Augustulus and the Fall of Constantinople as the end of Rome in the west and east, respectively.  See Third Rome for a discussion of claimants to the succession of Rome.

 Millennia: 1st BC1st–2nd

 Centuries: 7th BC6th BC5th BC4th BC3rd BC2nd BC1st BC1st2nd3rd4th5th6th7th8th9th10th11th12th13th14th15th

8th and 7th centuries BC

6th century BC

5th century BC

4th century BC

3rd century BC

2nd century BC

1st century BC

1st century

2nd century

3rd century

4th century

5th century

6th century

7th century

8th century

9th century

10th century

11th century

12th century

13th century

14th century

15th century

See also
 History of the Roman Empire

References 

01
Roman